Susanlimae is a genus of monopisthocotylean monogeneans in the family Ancyrocephalidae (or Dactylogyridae, according to the classification used).

The etymology of the genus name is an homage to the Malaysian parasitologist Susan Lim. The authors stated that Dr. Lim was greatly responsible for most of our knowledge of the diversity of Monogenea from Asian Siluriformes.

Species
The genus Susanlimae includes the single species Susanlimae ianwhittingtoni, which is also the type-species.

References

Ancyrocephalidae
Monotypic protostome genera